Boronia exilis is a plant in the citrus family, Rutaceae and is endemic to a small area in the south-west of Western Australia. It is a slender, erect perennial with well-spaced, simple, more or less cylindrical leaves and pink, four-petalled flowers in groups of between three and nine on the ends of the branches.

Description

Taxonomy and naming
Boronia exilis was first formally described in 1998 by Paul G. Wilson and the description was published in Nuytsia from a specimen collected in the Scott National Park. The specific epithet (exilis) is a Latin word meaning "thin" or "slender". referring to the stems of this boronia.

Distribution and habitat
This boronia grows is only known from the Scott River area where it grows in seasonally wet heath.

Conservation
Boronia exilis is classified as "endangered" under the Australian Government Environment Protection and Biodiversity Conservation Act 1999 and as "Threatened Flora (Declared Rare Flora — Extant)" by the Department of Environment and Conservation (Western Australia). An interim recovery plan has been prepared. The main threats to the species include inappropriate fire regimes, disease caused by Phytophthora cinnamomi and road maintenance activities.

References

exilis
Flora of Western Australia
Plants described in 1998
Taxa named by Paul G. Wilson
Endemic flora of Southwest Australia